In linguistics, referential indeterminacy is a situation in which different people vary in naming objects. For example, William Labov studied this effect using illustrations of different drinking vessels to see what people would label as "cups" and what people would label as "mugs".

See also
Idiolect

Linguistics